Brit Awards 1998  was the 18th edition of the Brit Awards, an annual pop music awards ceremony in the United Kingdom. It was organised by the British Phonographic Industry and took place on 9 February 1998 at the London Arena in London.

Performances

Winners and nominees

Freddie Mercury Award
Elton John

Most Selling Album Act
Spice Girls

Outstanding Contribution to Music
Fleetwood Mac

Multiple nominations and awards
The following artists received multiple awards and/or nominations.

References

External links
Brit Awards 1998 at Brits.co.uk

Brit Awards
Brit Awards, 1998
Brit Awards, 1998
Brit Awards
Brit
Brit Awards